James Anderson (25 December 1932, Glasgow – November 2019) was a Scottish former footballer who spent most of his playing career in England.

Playing career
Anderson played for Partick Avondale and then Portsmouth based RAOC Hilsea after joining the army. He went on to join Bristol Rovers in 1953, making his league debut the following year in a 5–3 defeat at Liverpool.

After 24 league appearances, Anderson moved to Chester in the summer of 1957, playing regularly initially but then finding his opportunities limited after the arrivals of Bobby Hunt and Frank Clempson. After leaving Chester in 1960, Anderson played for Rhyl and Weymouth before retiring in 1963. He was later employed by Vauxhall Motors and then worked in the construction industry.

External links
Chester City 'What Happened to...? feature on Jimmy Anderson

References

1932 births
2019 deaths
Footballers from Glasgow
English Football League players
Scottish footballers
Association football wing halves
Bristol Rovers F.C. players
Chester City F.C. players
Rhyl F.C. players
Weymouth F.C. players